Pamela "Pam" Snelgrove-Paul is a Canadian politician who has served various positions on the provincial and municipal levels of government. She served as a member of the Legislative Assembly of Alberta from 1997 to 2001 sitting with the Liberal caucus and later as an Independent in opposition.

Early life
Paul was born in Shelburne, Nova Scotia.

Political career
Paul has served as a Public School Trustee and Alderman for the City of St. Albert under her married name of Pam Smith. She was elected in a hotly contested race in Edmonton Castle Downs in the 1997 provincial election by just 87 votes, for the Alberta Liberal Party.

While serving as Member of the Legislative Assembly, Paul's divorced husband was arrested for domestic abuse, including tire-slashing stocking death threats and having a rifle in his possession.

She used her time as MLA to bring domestic violence, and woman's rights issues into the public spotlight.

In 1999 she sat as an independent after her experiences created turmoil in the Liberal caucus and did not run in the 2001 election.

Paul became an International Women's Day Award Recipient in 2005.

Electoral results

External links
Biography of Pamela Paul Bah'is of St. Albert (google archived)
Canadian Association of Professional Speakers, National Members

Living people
Alberta Liberal Party MLAs
Independent Alberta MLAs
Year of birth missing (living people)
People from Shelburne County, Nova Scotia
St. Albert, Alberta city councillors
Women MLAs in Alberta
Women municipal councillors in Canada